Payne County is located in the U.S. state of Oklahoma. As of the 2010 census, the population was 77,350. Its county seat is Stillwater. The county was created in 1890 as part of Oklahoma Territory and is named for Capt. David L. Payne, a leader of the "Boomers".

Payne County comprises the Stillwater, OK Micropolitan Statistical Area. The county lies northeast of the Oklahoma City metropolitan area although some consider it an extension of the Oklahoma City metro area due to commuter patterns and other indicators.

History
This county was established and named as the Sixth County by the Oklahoma Organic Act of 1890. It included land settled during the Land Run of 1889. The Organic Act settled a dispute between the towns of Stillwater and Perkins over which should be the county seat.

Eastern Oklahoma Railway built two lines in Payne County between 1900 and 1902, then immediately leased them to the Atchison, Topeka and Santa Fe Railway. The historic civil townships of the county were abolished by 1930. One north–south line ran between Pawnee, Stillwater, Ripley and Cushing before joining another north–south line that from Newark to Shawnee. Another line was built from Guthrie along the Cimarron River to Ripley. These lines were important in getting crops from farm to market.

In 2010, the Keystone-Cushing Pipeline (Phase II) was constructed into Payne County.

Geography

Payne County is covered by rolling plains, mostly within the Sandstone Hills physiographic region, but with the western part of the county in the Red Bed plains. The county has two significant reservoirs: Lake McMurtry and Lake Carl Blackwell. The Cimarron River and Stillwater Creek drain most of the county.

Major highways

  Interstate 35
  U.S. Highway 177
  U.S. Highway 412
  State Highway 18
  State Highway 33
  State Highway 51
  State Highway 86
  State Highway 99
  State Highway 108

Airports
 KSWO - Stillwater Regional Airport, Commercial service to Dallas via American Airlines
 KCUH - Cushing Municipal Airport

Adjacent counties
 Noble County (northwest)
 Pawnee County (northeast)
 Creek County (east)
 Lincoln County (south)
 Logan County (southwest)

Demographics

As of the census of 2000, there were 68,190 people, 26,680 households, and 15,314 families residing in the county. The population density was 99 people per square mile (38/km2). There were 29,326 housing units at an average density of 43 per square mile (16/km2). The racial makeup of the county was 84.33% White, 3.63% Black or African American, 4.58% Native American, 3.00% Asian, 0.04% Pacific Islander, 0.77% from other races, and 3.64% from two or more races. 2.15% of the population were Hispanic or Latino of any race.

There were 26,680 households, out of which 25.90% had children under the age of 18 living with them, 45.60% were married couples living together, 8.30% had a female householder with no husband present, and 42.60% were non-families. 30.10% of all households were made up of individuals, and 8.10% had someone living alone who was 65 years of age or older. The average household size was 2.29 and the average family size was 2.90.

In the county, the population was spread out, with 19.60% under the age of 18, 25.90% from 18 to 24, 26.20% from 25 to 44, 17.60% from 45 to 64, and 10.80% who were 65 years of age or older. The median age was 28 years. For every 100 females, there were 103.30 males. For every 100 females age 18 and over, there were 102.60 males.

The median income for a household in the county was $28,733, and the median income for a family was $40,823. Males had a median income of $31,132 versus $21,113 for females. The per capita income for the county was $15,983. About 10.80% of families and 20.30% of the population were below the poverty line, including 16.00% of those under age 18 and 8.50% of those age 65 or over.

Politics
Payne County is very conservative for a county dominated by a college town. While many such counties swung hard to the Democrats in the 1990s, Payne County has gone Republican in every election since 1968 and all but twice since 1944.  Since 1968, Jimmy Carter and Bill Clinton are the only Democrats to cross the 40 percent mark.

Economy
Agriculture was the basis of the county economy for more than fifty years. The primary crops were cotton, corn and wheat.

World War II caused hundreds of students at Oklahoma A & M to leave school for military service. To offset this loss to the local economy, civic and college leaders lobbied military officials and Oklahoma Senator Mike Monroney to have the school designated as a war training center. This resulted in the establishment of twelve training programs for the Navy, with nearly 40,000 people. The wartime experience showed local political leaders that it would be essential to diversify the county's economic base. They formed an Industrial Foundation to attract manufacturing plants and industrial jobs. This effort succeeded and accelerated an increase in population.

Education

Educational entities located in Payne County include:
 Oklahoma Department of Career and Technology Education
 Oklahoma State University-Stillwater
 Northern Oklahoma College

Communities

Cities

 Cushing
 Drumright (mainly in Creek County)
 Perkins
 Stillwater (county seat)
 Yale

Towns

 Glencoe
 Mulhall (mainly in Logan County)
 Orlando (partly in Logan County)
 Ripley

Census-designated places
 Ingalls
 Mehan
 Quay (partly in Pawnee County)

Other unincorporated communities
 Oak Grove
 Vinco
 Yost Lake

NRHP sites

The following sites in Payne County are listed on the National Register of Historic Places:

Other landmarks include:
 Allen Williamson Bridge - Memorial bridge near Ripley, named after the Oklahoma Representative Allen Williamson.

References

External links
 Payne County Government's website
 Oklahoma Digital Maps: Digital      Collections of Oklahoma and Indian Territory

 
1890 establishments in Oklahoma Territory
Populated places established in 1890
Oklahoma City metropolitan area